B-239 Carp  is a Russian Sierra-class submarine. It was known as K-239 before renaming in 1992. She was launched in 1983 and laid up in 1997. Withdrawn from the fleet on 05/30/1998.

In 2013, was planned for repair at the Zvyozdochka CS. According to the shipyard Zvezdochka the submarine's titanium hull was in good shape.
As of May 16, 2014, fuel has already begun to be unloaded from the reactor.  According to a report dated 7.7.2014, preparations began for the unloading of spent nuclear fuel.

In March 2015, it became known that the repair of the boat had been suspended.

As of 2020, the repair has been stopped, it is in reserve in Severovinsk.

References 

Sierra-class submarines
Ships built in the Soviet Union
1983 ships
Cold War submarines of the Soviet Union